The Scanian Dragoon Regiment, designated P 2 and P 2/Fo 14, was an armored regiment of the Swedish Army with its roots in the 17th century. The unit was first based in Helsingborg and later in Hässleholm.

History
The regiment was converted from an cavalry regiment to an armored regiment in 1942. The regiment was trained as pioneers in armoured warfare in Helsingborg between 1942 and 1947. At the start, they were crowded in the regiment built for five squadrons, which would now receive armored units with ten companies. The training area in Torekov was less useful and in 1943 the Ravlunda training area was purchased. After reconnaissance and political considerations, the training areas in Hässleholm were purchased in 1944. The construction period ended and on 30 September 1947, the regiment moved into Hässleholm.

The original tanks m/38, m/40 and m/42 were replaced in 1953 by Stridsvagn 81 (Centurion). The regiment had to lead the introduction and retraining of this significantly better tank. It also required better training areas and therefore the Ravlunda training area expanded in 1956 to double the area. The anti-tank guided missile training began in 1957. In addition to the Centurion training, from 1960, stridsvagn 74 units were also trained. The rearmament was completed by the Centurion stock. In 1963, the regiment changed its name to the Scanian Dragoon Regiment.

The brigade's KP-bil's were exchanged during the 1950s for Pansarbandvagn 301 and from 1968 for Pansarbandvagn 302. At the same time, Stridsvagn 103 was added to the regiment this year and crowned the introduction tests with a long march from Skövde via Malmö to Ravlunda and combat exercise with two companies. The Scanian Logistics Regiment (T 4) was grouped together with the regiment in 1986 and was part of the regiment from 1991.

Locations and training areas

Barracks
The establishment in Helsingborg, which was the regiment's first base, had an infrastructure that was dimensioned for five squadrons, while the armored regiment was to train ten companies. In the barracks area in Helsingborg, a number of barracks were built for both accommodation and school halls. These were later moved to Ravlunda, and formed the backbone of Dammåkra camp.

The 1 October 1947 was the official date that the regiment operated from Hässleholm. By co-locating the Scanian Logistics Regiment (T 4) with the Scanian Dragoon Regiment, a rebuilding and extension of the military restaurant and other extensions cost SEK 139.6 million. From 1 July 1994, Wendes Artillery Regiment and the staff of Kristianstad Defence District (Kristianstads försvarsområde, Fo 14) was co-located with the regiment.

Training areas
The units training areas included Ravlunda, Hovdala (together with Wendes Artillery Regiment) and Mölleröd.

Heraldry and traditions

Coat of arms
The coat of arms was used by the Scanian Dragoon Regiment (P 2) from 1977 to 1994 and by the Scanian Dragoon Brigade (Skånska dragonbrigaden, (PB 8/MekB 8) from 1994 to 2000. Blazon: "Or, the regimental badge, an erazed head of a griffin sable with open crown gules. The shield is surmounted ten squadron standards, placed in two groups of five in saltire, the uppermost dexter on argent arms or, the others fessed yellow and blue and charged with an erazed head of a griffin gules".

The coat of arms was used by the North Scanian Dragoon Regiment (P 2/Fo 14) from 1994 to 2000 and the Scanian Dragoon Group (Skånska dragongruppen, SDG) in Hässleholm from 2000 to 2004. Blazon: "Or, the badge of former Kristianstad County, an erazed head of a griffin gules with open crown azure carrying five plums - red, argent, red, argent, red - and arms azure. The shield is surmounted ten squadron standards, placed in two groups of five in saltire, the uppermost dexter on argent arms or, the others fessed yellow and blue and charged with an erazed head of a griffin gules".

Colours, standards and guidons
A unit standard was presented to the former Scanian Dragoon Regiment on 1 October 1992 by the His Majesty the King Carl XVI Gustaf at Stockholm Palace. It was used as regimental standard by P 2 up to 30 June 2000 and then as brigade standard by the Scanian Dragoon Brigade (MekB 8) until 1 July 2000. The standard is drawn by Ingrid Lamby and embroidered by machine in insertion technique by the company Libraria and Gunilla Hjort. Blazon: "On yellow cloth the badge of the regiment; an erazed black head of a griffin with an open red crown. On a black border at the upper side of the standard, battle honours (Lund 1676, Punitz 1704, Landskrona 1677, Fraustadt 1706, Kliszów 1702 Rajovka 1708, Pułtusk 1703, Bornhöft 1813) in yellow. Yellow fringe".

A unit guidon was presented to the then North Scanian Dragoon Regiment on 30 June 1994 His Majesty the King Carl XVI Gustaf at Stortorget in Hässleholm. It was used as regimental guidon by P 2/Fo 14 until 1 July 2000. The guidon is drawn by Bengt Olof Kälde and embroidered by machine in insertion technique by Maj Britt Salander/company Blå Kusten. Blazon: "On swallowtailed yellow cloth the provincial badge of the former Kristianstad County; an erazed red head of a griffin with a blue crown with five plumes - red, white, red, white and red (a legacy from the then North Scanian Regiment, P 6). Yellow fringe".

Medals
The medal ribbon is of yellow moiré with black edges and two black stripes on the middle.

The medal is oval in shape. The medal ribbon is of blue moiré with broad black edges and a black stripe on the middle followed on both sides by a broader yellow stripe. A crowned SD in silver/bronze is attached to the ribbon.

Commanding officers
Commanding officers between 1941 and 1997:

1942–1949: Anders Nordström
1949–1952: Arvid Eriksson
1952–1957: Stig af Klercker
1957–1967: Carl Erik Wilhelm Lorichs
1967–1972: Nils Isaksson
1972–1980: Björn Zickerman
1980–1981: Hodder Stjernswärd
1981–1986: Hans Nilsson
1986–1990: Stig Arnold Edgren
1990–1992: Jan Gunnar Bergsström
1992–1994: Mats Göran Hansson
1994–1998: Jan Gunnar Bergström
1998–2000: Kjell Åke Plantin

Names, designations and locations

See also
List of Swedish armoured regiments

Footnotes

References

Notes

Print

Further reading

Armored regiments of the Swedish Army
Disbanded units and formations of Sweden
Military units and formations established in 1942
Military units and formations disestablished in 2000
1942 establishments in Sweden
2000 disestablishments in Sweden
Helsingborg Garrison
Hässleholm Garrison